Anchoviella is a genus of anchovies, native to coastal parts of the tropical western Atlantic and eastern Pacific oceans, as well as rivers in South America.

Species
There are currently 15 recognized species in this genus:
 Anchoviella alleni G. S. Myers, 1940 (Allen's anchovy)
 Anchoviella balboae D. S. Jordan & Seale, 1926 (Balboa anchovy)
 Anchoviella blackburni Hildebrand, 1943 (Blackburns's anchovy)
 Anchoviella brevirostris Günther, 1868 (Snubnose anchovy)
 Anchoviella carrikeri Fowler, 1940 (Carriker's anchovy)
 Anchoviella cayenensis Puyo, 1946 (Cayenne anchovy)
 Anchoviella elongata Meek & Hildebrand, 1923 (Elongate anchovy)
 Anchoviella guianensis C. H. Eigenmann, 1912 (Guyana anchovy)
 Anchoviella jamesi D. S. Jordan & Seale, 1926 (James's anchovy)
 Anchoviella juruasanga Loeb, 2012
 Anchoviella lepidentostole Fowler, 1911 (Broadband anchovy)
 Anchoviella manamensis Cervigón, 1982 (Manamo anchovy)
 Anchoviella perezi Cervigón, 1987
 Anchoviella perfasciata Poey, 1860 (Poey's anchovy)
 Anchoviella vaillanti Steindachner, 1908 (Vaillant's anchovy)

References

Anchovies
Marine fish genera
Fish of the Western Atlantic
Fish of the Pacific Ocean
Freshwater fish of South America
Taxa named by Henry Weed Fowler